The 2020 LS Tractor 200 was a NASCAR Xfinity Series race held on March 7, 2020 at Phoenix Raceway in Avondale, Arizona. Contested over 200 laps on the  asphalt oval, it was the fourth race of the 2020 NASCAR Xfinity Series season. Brandon Jones won his first race of the 2020 season, and the first of his career at Phoenix Raceway.

This was the last race to run before the season was put on hold due to the COVID-19 pandemic.

Report

Background 
Phoenix Raceway is a 1.022 mi (1.645 km), low-banked tri-oval race track located in Avondale, Arizona. The motorsport track opened in 1964 and currently hosts two NASCAR race weekends annually. PIR has also hosted the IndyCar Series, CART, USAC and the Rolex Sports Car Series. The raceway is currently owned and operated by International Speedway Corporation.

Entry list 

 (R) denotes rookie driver.
 (i) denotes driver who is ineligible for series driver points.

 Ray Black Jr. started from the rear due to unapproved adjustments.

Practice

First practice 

Final practice 

Qualifying 

Qualifying results

Race

Race results

Stage Results 
Stage One

Laps: 45

Stage Two

Laps: 45

Final Stage Results 

Laps: 110

Race statistics 

 Lead changes: 12 among 7 different drivers
 Cautions/Laps: 7 for 45
 Red flags: 0
 Time of race: 2 hours, 9 minutes, 47 seconds
 Average speed:

Media

Television 
The LS Tractor 200 was carried by FS1 in the United States. Adam Alexander, Stewart-Haas Racing driver Clint Bowyer, and Team Penske driver Joey Logano called the race from the booth, with Jamie Little and Vince Welch covering pit road.

Radio 
The Motor Racing Network (MRN) called the race for radio, which was simulcast on SiriusXM NASCAR Radio. Kurt Becker and Dan Hubbard anchored the action from the booth. Dillon Welch called the action from Turns 1 & 2 and Jeff Striegle called the race through turns 3 & 4. Steve Post and Kim Coon provided reports from pit road.

Standings after the race 

 Drivers' Championship standings

Note: Only the first 12 positions are included for the driver standings.

References 

2020 NASCAR Xfinity Series
LS Tractor 200
2020 in sports in Arizona
NASCAR races at Phoenix Raceway